The 2017 Coastal Carolina Chanticleers football team represented Coastal Carolina University in the 2017 NCAA Division I FBS football season. The Chanticleers played their home games at the Brooks Stadium in Conway, South Carolina, and competed in the Sun Belt Conference. They were led by interim head coach Jamey Chadwell, who also served as offense coordinator, while permanent head coach Joe Moglia was on leave due to medical issues. The season marked the Chanticleers' first year in the Sun Belt and the FBS, and their second of a two year transition period. They would not become bowl-eligible until the 2018 season. They finished the season 3–9, 2–6 in Sun Belt play to finish in a tie for 10th place.

Previous season 
The Chanticleers finished the 2016 season 10–2 in their first season in a two-year transition period. The team played as an FCS independent school, playing members of their former conference, the Big South.

Schedule and results
Coastal Carolina announced its 2017 football schedule on March 1, 2017. The 2017 schedule consisted of six home and away games in the regular season. The Chanticleers hosted Sun Belt foes Georgia Southern, Georgia State, Texas State, and Troy, and traveled to Appalachian State, Arkansas State, Idaho, and Louisiana–Monroe

The Chanticleers hosted two of the four non-conference opponents, Massachusetts, who was independent from a conference and Western Illinois from the FCS Missouri Valley Football Conference, and traveled to Arkansas from the Southeastern Conference and UAB from Conference USA. 
 

Schedule Source:

Game summaries

UMass

at UAB

Western Illinois

at Louisiana–Monroe

Georgia State

at Arkansas State

at Appalachian State

Texas State

at Arkansas

Troy

at Idaho

Georgia Southern

References

Coastal Carolina
Coastal Carolina Chanticleers football seasons
Coastal Carolina Chanticleers football